Ibarac is a small town in the municipality of Rožaje, Montenegro. It is located just southwest of Rožaje town.

Demographics
According to the 2011 census, its population was 3,135.

References

Populated places in Rožaje Municipality